In mathematics, the closed graph theorem may refer to one of several basic results characterizing continuous functions in terms of their graphs. 
Each gives conditions when functions with closed graphs are necessarily continuous.

Graphs and maps with closed graphs 

Any continuous function into a Hausdorff space has a closed graph. 

Any linear map,  between two topological vector spaces whose topologies are (Cauchy) complete with respect to translation invariant metrics, and if in addition (1a)  is sequentially continuous in the sense of the product topology, then the map  is continuous and its graph, is necessarily closed.

Examples of continuous maps that do not have a closed graph 

If  is any space then the identity map  is continuous but its graph, which is the diagonal , is closed in  if and only if  is Hausdorff. In particular, if  is not Hausdorff then  is continuous but does  have a closed graph. 

Closed graph theorem in point-set topology 

In point-set topology, the closed graph theorem states the following:

Non-Hausdorff spaces are rarely seen, but non-compact spaces are common. An example of non-compact  is the real line, which allows the discontinuous function with closed graph .

For set-valued functions

In functional analysis 

The closed graph theorem is an important result in functional analysis that guarantees that a closed linear operator is continuous under certain conditions. 
The original result has been generalized many times. 
A well known version of the closed graph theorems is the following.

See also

Notes

References

Bibliography 

  
 
  
  
  
  
  
 
  
  
  
 

Theorems in functional analysis